Vidushi Sumitra Guha is an Indian classical vocalist, known for her expertise in the Carnatic and Hindustani schools of classical music. The Government of India honored her in 2010, with the fourth highest civilian award of Padma Shri.

Biography
Sumitra Guha, née Raju, was born in Andhra Pradesh to a locally known singer, Smt. Rajyalakshmi Raju and R. G. Narayana Raju, a retired Deputy Collector, a native of Tirumala Reddypalle, Chitoor Dist. Her sister is the noted Carnatic vocalist and exponent of the sankirtana of gospel of the 15th-century saint-composer, Annamacharya, Smt. Shobha Raju and her grandnephew, is Sreyash Sarkar. Guha took to music at an early age, receiving the first lessons in music from her mother. Her formal education in music started at the age of eleven from S. R. Janakiraman, a renowned music guru of Carnatic Classical Music. Having grown up in  a small village of Andhra Pradesh, she wanted to become a doctor because of the nobility of the profession. Her father, having been transferred to Nepal, suggested that she join Visva-Bharati University, Shantiniketan. She carried on with her academic education, pursuing graduate studies in philosophy. She started learning Hindustani music in 1964 and continued her music studies under Pandit A. Kanan and Vidushi Malabika Kanan of Kirana Gharana, and later received some guidance from Sushil Kumar Bose, a renowned exponent of music who learned under the tutelage of Ustad Bade Ghulam Ali Khan of the Patiala Gharana, all in the culturally enriching atmosphere of Calcutta.

Guha continued her studies even after her marriage in a Bengali family  at the age of 19, and in 1972, became a B-grade artist of the All India Radio. The same year, she debuted as a performer with her concert at Thirumala temple in Tirupati. At AIR, she got the opportunity to participate in four chain concerts of the station in 1982, 85, 89 and 90 and several Radio Sangeet Sammelans and national programmes for AIR and Doordarshan. By 1995, she got the title of Vidhushi. and the same year she became a Top Grade artist of the All India Radio.

Guha is proficient in Carnatic and Hindustani schools of music and is the first Andhra woman to sing Hindustani music, but is more aligned to the latter with a known leaning towards the Kirana Gharana. The depth of the alaap, the slow elaboration of notes in the vistaar and the stability of swaras became her signature style and she became one with the putative Gharana with an exceptional quality of infusing indomitable spirituality in her renditions, as substantiated by concerts in India and later on, abroad. Having been invited to and sponsored by various music foundations abroad, she has travelled widely giving performances and holding workshops in the United States, Canada, Mauritius, West Asia, South-East Asia, Europe including Russia, Algeria, Ukraine, France, Italy, Korea, Germany, Yugoslavia, Holland and the UK.<ref name="Maharishi University of Management Press"

In his 'Khayal Vocalism: Continuity Within Change', Deepak Raja, the eminent musicologist writes about Guha's prowess as a classical musician:

In 1995, the Central Production Centre of Doordarshan made a documentary, Ek Mulakat on the life of Guha. She has also recorded for the Sangeet Natak Akademi and others such as MMY Music Foundation and HMV.

For the Sangeet Natak Academy and the national channels of AIR, Guha has recorded many performances. She has also sung fusion music with renowned musicians from abroad. Her performance at the India Habitat Centre, Delhi, in tandem with the double Grammy award winner, Robin Hogarth, based on Sant Kabir's music was a blend of Hindustani and African gospel music traditions. She has also done a music series by name, Tribute to the Musical Saints of India, was performed at various concerts in India. She has worked on a research-based music project by name, OMKARA - The Sound of Divine Love, Directed by Guinness World Record® holder Rupam Sarmah, Grammy award winner Pandit Vishwa Mohan Bhatt and others. Recently, she has introduced a new project "Musical Journey Towards Rising India". This project is in collaboration with internationally acclaimed Indian Classical musician Rupam Sarmah, Co-Producer, award-winning singer, songwriter & Guinness World Record® holder who is based in California. Guha and Rupam Sarmah have represented India for Festival of India concerts in France (2018) organized by Ministry of Culture, Govt. of India, and Embassy of India in Paris on the occasion of India's 70th Independence.

Guha founded the Sumadhur School of Performing Arts which continues to teach music in the traditional gurukula style. The primary purpose of such a system is the direct interaction between the Guru (teacher) and Shishya (disciple), a one-to-one association which forms a channel through which knowledge is imparted. This enables to create a wonderful environment and relationship between the guru and shishya.

Awards and recognitions
Guha has received many awards and honors starting from the gold medals she received from the Tirumala Tirupati Devasthanam at Tirupati and from the All India Vaggeykar Utsavams at Bhadrachalam in 1972. West Bengal Journalists Association awarded her the Best Vocalist of the Year prize in 1991 and a year later, she received the title Vidushi, in 1995.

Many music and arts organizations have recognized her; Sangeet Kala Ratna from the Sangeet Kala Kendra, Agra in 1997, Best Music Teacher award from the Sangam Kala Group at the National Music Awards 2006, Pt. Gama Maharaj Smriti Samman in 2006, Rashtra Bhushan Samman from the Vishwa Jagriti Mission in 2007, DTA Excellence Award from the Delhi Telugu Academy in 2008, Mahandhra Excellence Award from the Telugu Employers’ Welfare Association (Delhi), Face Award in 2009, Naadbrahm Shiromani from Sangeetanjali, Mumbai in 2010, Sangeet Vibhuti Samman from the Gandhi Hindustani Sahitya Sabha and Sangeet Shree Award from the Art and Cultural Trust of India, in 2011 are some of the awards Guha has received during her career.

The Government of India included her in the 2010 Republic Day honours list for the fourth highest award of Padma Shri.

Rave Reviews
 A Rare Breed	...The Statesman
 Andhra's gift to the nation	...The Statesman
 Now, there's magic	...The Times of India
 Sumitra Guha scaling new peaks	...The New Indian Express, Vijayawada
 The ebb and flow of melody	...The Hindu
 Soulful Soloist	...Metro Now
 Sumitra sang like the cuckoo bird with its honeyed voice in Spring	...Vanitha Jyothi
 Sumitra's instant victory of voice in Mauritius	...The Statesman
 It was obvious from the opening German Concert in Saarbrücken that it was a very special tour. The audience was so entranced that they did not want to leave the blissful atmosphere created by the musicians	...Konzertburo Report, Wegberg, Germany
 She unfolded the raga with the tender care one would bestow on unfurling the petals of a delicate flower awaiting full bloom	...The Hindustan times
 She is not merely better. She is different	...The Times of India
 Enthralled listeners with her technical prowess and devotional fervor	...The Hindu
 She is not only a versatile singer but also a gifted composer	...The Hindu
 Certainly, music has no barriers. The scintillating performance by Padma Shree Vidushi Sumitra Guha and Double Grammy Award Winner Robin Hogarth bore testament to the fact that when it comes to music language has no role to play	...The Times of India

See also
 Carnatic music
 Hindustani music
 Kirana Gharana

References

External links
 
 
 

Year of birth missing (living people)
Living people
Recipients of the Padma Shri in arts
Singers from Andhra Pradesh
Indian women classical singers
Hindustani singers
Women Carnatic singers
Carnatic singers
20th-century Indian singers
Women Hindustani musicians
20th-century Indian women singers
21st-century Indian women singers
21st-century Indian singers
Women musicians from Andhra Pradesh
Recipients of the Sangeet Natak Akademi Award